These hits topped the Dutch Top 40 in 1980.

See also
1980 in music

References

1980 in the Netherlands
1980 record charts
1980